The Polish–Soviet war erupted in 1919 in the aftermath of World War I. The root causes were twofold: a territorial dispute dating back to Polish–Russian wars in the 17–18th centuries; and a clash of ideology due to RSFSR's goal of spreading communist rule further west, to Europe (Soviet westward offensive of 1918–19). At that time both countries had just undergone transition: in 1918 Poland reclaimed independence after 123 years of partitions. In 1917 the October Revolution replaced the liberal, democratic Provisional Government, that had previously displaced the Tsar in Russia, with Soviet rule. The war ended with the Treaty of Riga in 1921, which settled the border issue and regulated Polish-Soviet relations until the German-Soviet invasion of Poland in 1939.

Soviet Forces in early 1920

Soviet forces had won a recent series of major victories against the White Russians, defeating Denikin, and had signed peace treaties with Latvia and Estonia. The Polish front, formerly a distraction, became the most important war theater and majority of Soviet resources and forces were diverted into it. In January 1920, the Red Army began concentrating a 700,000-strong force near the Berezina River and in the Byelorussian Soviet Socialist Republic. The Red Army totaled 5,000,000, with additional millions of Russian recruits to draw from, but much of that force was still engaged in the civil war. This number of troops were far less virile than the number of weapons available, and only one in nine soldiers could be properly classified a fighting man. In the course of 1920, almost 800,000 Red Army personnel were sent to fight in the Polish war, of whom 402,000 went to the Western front and 355,000 to the armies of the South-West front in Galicia. The Soviet manpower pool in the West was estimated at 790,000. The Soviets had at their disposal much military equipment left by withdrawing German armies, and modern Allied armaments (including armoured cars, armoured trains, trucks and artillery) captured from the White Russians and the Allied expeditionary forces following their defeat in the Russian Civil War. With the new forces, Soviet High Command planned a new offensive in late April/May.

 
Bolshevik commanders in the Red Army's coming offensive would include Mikhail Tukhachevski (new commander of the Western Front), Leon Trotsky, the future Soviet ruler Joseph Stalin, and the founder of the Cheka secret police, Felix Dzerzhinsky.

Polish Forces in early 1920

The Polish Army was made up of soldiers who had formerly served in the various partitioning empires, supported by inexperienced volunteers and recruits. Logistics were a nightmare, relying on whatever equipment was left over from World War I and could be captured. The Polish Army employed guns made in five countries, and rifles manufactured in six, each using different ammunition. Before the Battle of Warsaw the 1st Legions Infantry Division comprised three regiments, one of which was armed with German Mauser rifles, a second with French Lebel rifles and Berthier carbines, while the third used Russian Mosin–Nagant rifles. Each make of weapon took ammunition of a different caliber.

The Polish forces grew from approximately 100,000 in 1918 to over 500,000 in early 1920. By 20 August 1920, the Polish army had reached a strength of 737,767, so there was rough numerical parity between the Polish army and the opposing Soviet forces. Polish intelligence knew the Soviets had prepared for a new offensive; the Polish High Command decided to launch a preemptive attack. The plan for Operation Kiev was more ambitious than simply defeating the Red Army on Poland's southern flank. It aimed at creating a friendly government within the captured Ukrainian territories. Afterwards, Piłsudski and his Polish General Staff planned to reassign the 3rd Army to the north, where Polish planners expected a major Red Army counteroffensive.

Operation Kiev 

Until April the Polish forces had been slowly but steadily advancing eastward. By early January 1920, Polish forces had reached the line of Uszyca–Płoskirów–Starokonstantynów–Szepietówka–Zwiahel–Olewsk–Uborć–Bobrujsk–Berezyna–Dyneburg. The new Latvian government requested Polish help in capturing Dyneburg, and it was, after heavy fighting (3 January – 21 January) by the Polish 1st and 3rd Legion Divisions under Rydz-Śmigły. The city was then handed to the Latvians, who viewed the Poles as liberators. By March, Polish forces had driven a wedge between Soviet forces in the north (Bielorussia) and south (Ukraine), capturing the towns of Mozyrz and Kalenkowicze and significantly disrupting Soviet plans for their early offensive.

On April 24 Poland began its main offensive, Operation Kiev, aimed at creating an independent Ukraine to become part of Piłsudski's Międzymorze Federation and an ally against the Soviets. Poland was assisted by the allied forces of Symon Petliura's Ukrainian People's Republic. The Polish 3rd Army under Rydz-Śmigły, supported by 6th Army under W. Iwaszkiewicz and the 2nd Army under Listowski, easily won border clashes with the Red Army in Ukraine, which was weakened by dissent and Galician uprisings. The combined Polish-Ukrainian forces captured Kiev on May 7, encountering only token resistance. The Bolshevik forces, though in bad shape, avoided complete destruction. The Polish offensive halted at Kiev, although it did capture a small bridgehead on the eastern bank of the Dnieper River (May 9). Polish forces began preparing for an offensive towards north and the city of Żłobin, which would open the shortest train communication between Polish held Mińsk and Kiev. A Polish-Ukrainian propaganda campaign to form a Ukrainian army capable of defending Ukraine, while initially successful, had to be abandoned before it yielded any significant results. The population was tired by several years of war, and the Ukrainian Army attained a strength of only two divisions.

The Polish military thrust soon met with the Red Army counterattack (Soviet May Offensive). The Soviet Southwest Front was commanded by Alexander Ilyich Yegorov. On 15 May the Soviet 15th Army attacked Polish positions near Ułła, and the 16th Army crossed the Berezina River between Borysów and Bobrujsk. Polish forces in that area, preparing for an offensive towards Żłobin, managed to push the Soviet forces back into the river, but were unable to pursue their own planned offensive. In the north Polish forces had done much worse. The Polish 1st Army was defeated and started a retreat towards Mołodeczno, pursued by the 15th army which had recaptured the territory between Dzwina and Berezyna.  The Polish then attempted to take advantage of the exposed Soviet flanks, with Armia Rezerwowa attacking from Święciany and Grupa Skierskiego attacking from Borysów.  Their plan was to envelop and crush the advancing Soviet forces, and have the 1st Army prevent any Soviet reinforcements. This time the 1st Army performed better, but the enveloping forces still failed to stop the Soviet advance.  By the end of May, the front had stabilized near the small river of Auta, and Soviet forces begun preparing for their next attack, targeting the Połosck region. 

On May 24, 1920, the Polish–Ukrainian forces in the south clashed with the Semyon Budionny's famous 1st Cavalry Army (Konarmia). The Polish-Ukrainian forces succeeded in slowing and even defeating the Red Army on a number of occasions. Morale was high: the Polish-Ukrainian forces were eager to defend Ukraine and were confident in their ability to succeed. Polish High Command underestimated the quality of both Budionny's forces and the tactical role of cavalry, which hadn't fared well in the First World War trench warfare. Repeated attacks by Budionny's Cossack cavalry however, broke the Polish-Ukrainian front on June 5 and allowed mobile cavalry units to disrupt the Polish rear communication and logistics. By June 10, the Polish armies were in retreat along the entire front. Soviet forces under Golikow crossed Dniepr west of Czerniow cutting the rail communication in that region and Soviet forces under Yakir captured the Bila Tserkva.  The Polish 3rd army in Kiev faced the danger of being completely enveloped.

It was a bitter day for the Poles and Ukrainians when, on June 13, they abandoned Kiev to the Bolsheviks. The small group of Petlyura's Ukrainians did not lose their morale and fought with determination throughout the rest of the war. In the face of near-unlimited Russian reserves and slow growth of the Ukrainian Army, the Polish and Ukrainian forces were ordered to retreat.

Bolshevik victories 

The commander of the Polish 3rd Army in Ukraine, General Rydz-Śmigły, decided to break through toward the northwest and the town of Korosteń, thus avoiding a direct confrontation with the bulk of Soviet 1st Cavalry Army near Koziatyń. Soviet forces were plagued by communication and coordination difficulties, and Polish forces managed to withdraw in orderly fashion and relatively unscathed, they were tied down in Ukraine and lacked sufficient strength to support Poland's Northern Front and reinforce the defenses at the Auta River for the decisive battle that was soon to take place there. Polish 3rd Army and newly formed 2nd Army regrouped near Słucza and started a series of their own counterattacks. However, Polish counterattacks in June and July all failed after initial successes. In the battles (19 June at Usza, 1 July at Horyń, 8 July at Równe) Bolsheviks were delayed but eventually Budionny's forces advanced east. When eventually in mid July Bolsheviks forces in Ukraine appeared to have been stopped by Polish forces, a new Soviet offensive north would prove even more devastating for the Polish forces.

Poland's 320-kilometre-long front was manned by a thin line of 120,000 troops of the 1st and 4th Armies and Group Polesie. Logistics were a problem, and the force had inadequate support of only 460 artillery pieces. Gen. Szeptycki, commander of the Polish Northeast Front, had no strategic reserves, and some forces have been shuffled south to stop the Soviet offensive in Ukraine and Galicia. This approach to holding ground harked back to Great War practice of "establishing a fortified line of defense." Where it was a viable strategy on the Western Front, where each inch was saturated with troops, machine guns and artillery, the spacious fields of the Eastern Front would require a much larger force then those fielded by the Allies and the Central Powers in the West. Piłsudski tried to formulate a newe strategy of "strategie de plein air" (French: a "strategy of open space") rather than to try to tie his insufficient forces to mostly inexistant fixed positions, but his suggestions were not met with approval of other commanding officers. Meanwhile, the Red Army's Northwest Front was commanded by the young General Mikhail Tukhachevski. Tukhachevski forces of 108,000 infantry and 11,000 cavalry, supported by 722 artillery pieces and 2,913 machine guns were divided into one cavalry corps and four armies: the 3rd cavalry and 4th, 15th, 3rd and 16th armies, deployed respectively from north to south. With the advantage of being able to plan their offensive, crucially, the Russians were able to achieve a four-to-one force advantage in the planned break-through points.

Soviet offensive begun on July 4 along the axis Smolensk–Brest-Litovsk, crossing rivers of Auta and Berezyna. The northern 3rd Cavalry Corps of Gej-Chan was to envelope Polish forces from the north, moving near Lithuanian and Prussian border territories, both unfriendly to Poland. 4th, 15th and 3rd Armies were to push decisively west, supported from south by the 16th Army and Grupa Mozyrska. For the three days the Polish forces held, yet despite local victories, such as when two battalions of the Polish 33rd Infantry Regiment, held the advance of two and a half Red Army divisions for a full day, securing the northern flank of the Polish front the Russians' numerical superiority eventually won them the day. Tukhachevski's plan to break through and push the southwest Polish units into the Pinsk Marshes (Błota Poleskie) failed, but the northern theatre proven to be his decisive victory. Gej-Chan broke through the northern Polish units on the first day of the offensive and Polish 1st Army pursued by Gej-Chan forces started a disorganised retreat. From July 7 the Polish forces were in full retreat on the entire front.

Poles attempted to regroup at the heavily fortified line of German World War I field fortifications. The "Battle for Wilno" took place here from July 11 to July 14. Once again, however, the Polish troops were unable to man the whole front, and Soviet forces broke through one of the weak points in the north. Gej-Chan forces, supported by Lithuanian forces, captured Wilno on 14 July, making Polish plans for defensive along old German trenches useless. On 19 July Grodno fell and after a failed Polish counterattack towards Grodno the 1st Army had to retreat behind Neman River and was soon pushed further back. The whole front was rolled back. In the south, in Galicia, General Semyon Budionny's Red Cavalry Army advanced far into the Polish rears, capturing Brodno and approaching Lwów and Zamość. In early July it became clear to the Poles that the Russians' objectives were not limited to pushing their borders farther west. Poland's very independence was at stake.

The Russian forces advanced rapidly at a rate of 32 kilometres a day; shocking many commanders and foreign observers who were expecting a repeat of the Western snail paced advance. After the capture of Grodno in Belarus on July 19, Tukhachevski ordered that Warsaw be taken by August 12. When Brest-Litovsk fell on August 1 and the Narew and Bug River were crossed by the Red Army, Soviet forces faced no natural barriers between them and the Vistula River on which Warsaw was situated. Polish attempt to defend the Bug River line with 4th Army and Grupa Poleska units stopped the advance of the Red Army for only one week. The Red Army advance slowed down – but only to 19 kilometres a day. Units of the Russian Northwest Front, after taking Łomża and Ostrołęka (by Gej-Chan) and crossing the Narew River on August 2, approached the 100 kilometres radius from Warsaw. Fortress of Brześć which was to be the headquarters of Polish planned counteroffensive fell to the 16th Army in the first attack. The Russian Southwest Front had pushed Polish forces out of Ukraine and was advancing on Zamość and Lwów, the metropolis of southeastern Poland and an important industrial center, defended by the Polish 6th Army. Polish Galicia's Lwów (Ukrainian Lviv) was besieged, and five Russian armies were approaching Warsaw.

Polish forces in Galicia near Lwów launched a counteroffensive to slow the Soviets down. The 6th Army of general Jędrzejewski and elements of the Ukrainian forces defended Lwów, and the 2nd Army and Grupa Operacyjna Jazdy attacked from Styr towards Brody and Radziwiłłów, Masovian Voivodeship. During the battle of Brody (29 July – 2 August) Polish forces managed to recapture Brody (18 Dywizja Piechoty) and surround parts of Soviets forces. This had put a stop to the retreat of Polish forces on the southern front, but the worsening situation near Polish capital of Warsaw prevented Poles from continuing that southern counteroffensive and pushing east. After Soviets captured Brześć, the Polish offensive in the south was put on hold and all available forces moved north to take part in the coming battle for Warsaw.

Polish and Soviet internal politics 

With the turning tide against Poland, Piłsudski's political power had been weakened and his opponents, including Roman Dmowski had risen to power, but he had regained it as the Soviet forces were approaching Warsaw. The government of Leopold Skulski had resigned and new prime minister Stanisław Grabski had transferred all power to the Rada Obrony Państwa (Council of Country's Defence) which consisted of Naczelnik Państwa (the title of Józef Piłsudski), Marshall of the Sejm, prime minister, 3 ministers, 3 army's representatives and 10 members of the parliament. Grabski's government supported by the Western diplomats attempted to restart peace negotiations with the Soviets, but their attempts were completely ignored by the Soviet Side. Stanisław Grabski resigned and a new government was formed by Wincenty Witos.

By order of the Soviet Communist Party, a Polish puppet government, the Provisional Polish Revolutionary Committee (Polish: Tymczasowy Komitet Rewolucyjny Polski, TKRP), had been formed on 28 July in Białystok to organise administration of the Polish territories captured by the Red Army. It was composed of Polish communists and members of the Politburo of the Central Committee Soviet Communist Party: Julian Marchlewski (chairman), Edward Próchniak (secretary), Felix Dzerzhinsky, Feliks Kon and Józef Unszlicht. It began operating from 1 August issuing various decrees like nationalisation of industry, promising the creation of Polish Socialist Republic (Polska Socjalistyczna Republika Rad), creating 65 revolutionary committees, issuing newspaper Goniec Czerwony and recruiting soldiers for the 1 Polish Red Army commanded by R. Łągwa. TKRP was disbanded on 22 August. The TKRP had very little support from the ethnic Polish population and recruited its supporters mostly from the ranks of minorities, Belorussians and primarily Jews. At the height of the Polish-Soviet conflict, Jews had been subject to anti-semitic violence by Polish forces, who considered Jews to be a potential threat, and who often accused Jews as being the masterminds of Russian Bolshevism. At one point during the war, Jewish volunteer officers were imprisoned.

In Moscow, the delegates to the Second Congress of the Third International followed with enthusiasm the progress of the Russian forces. The delegates began to see Poland as the bridge over which communism would pass into Germany, bolstering the Communist Party of Germany.

In addition, political games between Soviet commanders of Soviet Fronts grew in the face of their more and more certain victory. Eventually the lack of cooperation between Soviet commanders would cost them dearly in the upcoming decisive Battle of Warsaw.

International reaction 

Western public opinion, swayed by the press and by left-wing politicians, was strongly anti-Polish. Many foreign observers expected Poland to be quickly defeated and become the next Soviet republic. Britain proposed negotiations between Poland and Russia to stabilize their border at the Curzon line or farther west, but the British proposal was disregarded by the Soviets, who expected a quick victory. Russian terms amounted to total Polish capitulation, and even so Lenin stalled in order to give his armies time to take Warsaw and conclude the war to Russia's advantage. Britain's Prime Minister, David Lloyd George, once a strong supporter of Imperial Russia, was now a Soviet sympathizer and authorized British sales of large quantities of armaments (including modern tanks) to fill urgent Soviet orders, at the same time blocking any British moves to aid Poland (which he called a historical mistake). The Polish cause in the United Kingdom was only supported by the head of the British military mission to Warsaw, General Sir Adrian Carton De Wiart and a few politicians led by the Secretary of State for War, Winston Churchill, who advocated moving Royal Air Force units to support Poland. On August 6, 1920, the British Labour Party published a pamphlet stating that British workers are not Poland's allies. The French socialist newspaper L'Humanité, declared:  "Not a man, not a sou, not a shell for reactionary and capitalist Poland. Long live the Russian Revolution! Long live the Workmen's International!" Poland suffered setbacks due to sabotage and delays in deliveries of war supplies, when workers in Austria, Czechoslovakia and Germany refused to transit such materials to Poland. In Gdańsk British troops were asked to unload ships with military supplies because the mostly German workers refused to do so; similar things happened in Czechoslovakian Brno.

Lithuania's stance was mostly anti-Polish and the country eventually joined the Soviet side in the war against Poland in July 1919. The Lithuanian decision was dictated by a desire to incorporate the city of Wilno (in Lithuanian, Vilnius) and the nearby areas into Lithuania and to a smaller extent by Soviet diplomatic pressure backed by the threat of the Red Army stationed on Lithuania's borders. The new Lithuanian government decided to make Vilnius the capital of Lithuania (it was the historical capital of the Grand Duchy of Lithuania), despite it being mainly Polish- and Belarusian-populated in the 20th century (~2% according to the Russian census in 1915, although much higher in the nearby rural areas). The Polish-Lithuanian War would continue until the autumn of 1920. The Lithuanian alliance with the Bolsheviks was somewhat countered by Latvia, which unlike her neighbour decided to join forces with Poland in the fight against the Soviets.

Polish allies were few. France, continuing her policy of countering Bolshevism, now that the Whites in Russia proper had been almost completely defeated, sent in 1919 a small advisory group to Poland's aid. This group comprised mostly French officers, although it also included a few British advisers. It was headed by British General Adrian Carton De Wiart and French General Paul Prosper Henrys. The French mission commanded considerable respect and influence through the activities of its 400 officer-instructors. These men, distributed among the cadres of the Polish Staff, were entrusted with training the officer corps in military science and in the use of French army manuals. The French effort was vital to improving the organization and logistics of the Polish Army, which until 1919 had used diverse manuals, organizational structures and equipment, mostly drawn from the armies of Poland's former partitioners.

In addition to the Allied advisors, France also facilitated in 1919 the transit to Poland from France of the "Blue Army" (otherwise "Haller's Army"): a force of troops (about six divisions), mostly of Polish origin plus some international volunteers, formerly under French command in World War I. The army was commanded by the Polish general, Józef Haller.

The French officers included a future President of France, Charles de Gaulle. Anxious for active service and sharing in the anti-Bolshevik ideology, he joined the 5th Chasseurs Polonais of Haller's army. He fought in the eastern Galicia, later he lectured on tactics at Rembertów near Warsaw. He won Poland's highest military decoration, the Virtuti Militari, but refused a permanent commission in Poland. Upon his return to France he would lecture on military history at Saint-Cyr, often drawing upon his experiences of the Polish–Soviet War.

The Hungarians, too, who had experienced Béla Kun's communist regime, became aware that Poles were fighting for their freedom as well. They planned to dispatch a 30,000-man cavalry corps to join the Polish Army, but the Czechoslovak government denied them passage across Czechoslovak territory . Their attempts to help Poland succeeded in the crucial period of the war, when several trains loaded with Hungary-made Mauser rifles reached Poland. That help was remembered by Poles as another manifestation of the traditional Polish-Hungarian friendship.

In mid-1920 the Allied Mission was expanded by some new advisers (the Interallied Mission to Poland). They included the French diplomat, Jean Jules Jusserand; Maxime Weygand, chief of staff to Marshal Ferdinand Foch, Supreme Commander of the victorious Entente;  and the British diplomat, Lord Edgar Vincent D'Abernon. The newest members of the mission achieved little; indeed, the crucial Battle of Warsaw was fought and won by the Poles before the mission could return and make its report. Subsequently, for many years, the myth persisted that it was the timely arrival of Allied forces that had saved Poland, a myth in which Weygand occupied the central role.

Weygand had traveled to Warsaw in the expectation of assuming command of the Polish Army, but had found a disappointing reception, aggravated by the fact that around the same time France have frozen its financial aid to Poland. His first meeting with Piłsudski on July 24 began on the wrong foot when he had no answer to Piłsudski's opening question, "How many divisions have you brought?" Weygand had none to offer. On 27 July he was installed as adviser to the Polish Chief of Staff, Tadeusz Rozwadowski, but their collaboration went poorly. He was treated with contempt by many Polish officers, his suggestions were regularly disregarded. One of the few officers who treated him fairly was General Władysław Sikorski. After a while, he threatened to leave, which he did shortly after the Polish victory at Warsaw. Before departing on August 25 he was consoled with the decoration of Virtuti Militari; Polish highest military award.  Upon returning to Paris, he was greeted as the victor of the war, receiving another decoration, French this time, the Grand Order of the Legion of Honor. In his memoirs he admitted that "the victory was Polish, the plan was Polish, the army was Polish." The myth of his victory would carry on in France and elsewhere, even in academic circles.

"Miracle at the Vistula" 

On August 10, 1920, Russian Cossack units under the command of Gay Dimitrievich Gay (sometimes called by Poles Gaj-Chan (pronounced "Guy Khan")) crossed the Vistula River, planning to take Warsaw from the west, that is from the direction opposite to that of the attacking main Soviet forces.  On August 13, an initial Russian attack under General Mikhail Tukhachevski was repulsed. The Polish 1st Army under Gen. Franciszek Latinik resisted a Red Army direct assault on Warsaw stopping the Soviet assault at Radzymin.  Tukhachevsky, certain that all was going according to plan, was actually falling into Piłsudski's trap. There were only token Polish troops in the path of the main Russian advance north and across the Vistula, on the right flank of the battle (from the perspective of the Soviet's advance. At the same time, south of Warsaw, on the battle's left front, the vital link between the North-Western and South-Western Fronts was much more vulnerable, protected only by a small Soviet force, the Mazyr Group. Further, Semyon Budyonny, commanding the 1st Cavalry Army, a unit much feared by Piłsudski and other Polish commanders, disobeyed orders by the Soviet High Command, which at Tukhachevsky's insistence, ordered him to advance at Warsaw from the south. Budyonny resented this order, influenced by a grudge between commanding South-Western Front generals Alexander Ilyich Yegorov and Tukhachevsky. In addition, the political games of Joseph Stalin, at the time the chief political commissar of the South-Western Front, further contributed to Yegorov's and Budyonny's disobedience. Stalin, looking for personal glory, aimed to capture the besieged Lwów (Lviv), an important industrial center. Ultimately, Budyonny's forces marched on Lwow instead of Warsaw and thus missed the battle.

The Polish 5th Army counterattacked on August 14, crossing the Wkra River. It faced the combined forces of the Soviet 3rd and 15th Armies (both numerically and technically superior). The struggle at Nasielsk lasted until August 15 and resulted in almost the complete destruction of the town. However, the Soviet advance toward Warsaw and Modlin was halted at the end of August 15 and on that day Polish forces recaptured Radzymin, which boosted the Polish morale.

From that moment on, Sikorski's 5th Army pushed exhausted Soviet units away from Warsaw, in an almost blitzkrieg-like operation. Sikorski's units were given the support of almost all of the small number of mechanized units – tanks and armoured cars – that the Polish Army had, as well as the support of the two Polish armoured trains. It was able to advance rapidly at the speed of 30 kilometres a day, disrupting the Soviet "enveloping" northern manoeuvre.

The Soviet armies in the center of the front fell into chaos. After the Polish 203rd Uhlan Regiment broke through the Bolshevik lines and destroyed the radio station of Aleksandr Shuvayev's Soviet 4th Army, that army continued to fight its way toward Warsaw alone, unaware of the overall situation. Only the Russian 15th Army remained an organized force and tried to obey Tukhachevski's orders, shielding the withdrawal of the westernmost 4th Army. But defeated twice, August 19 and 20, it became part of the general rout of the Northwest Front. Tukhachevski ordered a general retreat toward the Bug River, but by then he had lost contact with most of his forces near Warsaw, and all the Bolshevik plans had been thrown into disarray by communication failures. The Bolshevik armies retreated in a disorganised fashion, entire divisions panicking and disintegrating. By the end of August the 4th and 15th Red Armies had been defeated in the field, and their remnants crossed the border into East Prussia and were disarmed. Nevertheless, the troops were soon released and again fought against Poland. The Bolshevik 3rd Army retreated east so quickly that Polish forces could not catch up with them, and so that army sustained the fewest losses. The Bolshevik 16th Army disintegrated at Białystok, and most of its men become prisoners of war. The Red Army's defeat was so great and so unexpected that, at the instigation of Piłsudski's detractors, the Battle of Warsaw is often referred to in Poland as the "Miracle at the Vistula." The Soviet cavalry group that was trying to encircle Warsaw from the west, became helplessly isolated from the main forces. Panic started, several major officers abandoned their troops and escaped by cars to Białystok. Guy-Khan took the command, cruelly restored discipline, abandoned everything that would hinder fast march (in that number, he got rid of several thousand prisoners of war, having their throats slashed), and moved his troops so fast, that pursuit was impossible; they found refuge in East Prussia.

On August 17 the advance of Budionny's Cavalry Army toward Lwów was halted at the Battle of Zadwórze, where a small Polish force sacrificed itself to prevent Soviet cavalry from seizing Lwów and stopping vital Polish reinforcements from moving toward Warsaw. On 29 August Budionny's cavalry moving through weakly defended areas reached city of Zamość and attempted to take the city in the Battle of Zamość, but was soon facing increasing number of Polish units which could be spared from the successful Warsaw counteroffensive. On August 31 Budionny's cavalry finally broke off their siege of Lwów and attempted to come to the aid of Russian forces retreating from Warsaw, but were intercepted, encircled and defeated by Polish cavalry at the Battle of Komarów near Zamość, the greatest cavalry battle since 1813 (and one of the last cavalry battles ever). Budonny's Army managed to avoid encirclement, but its morale plummeted down. What was left of Buidonny's 1st Cavalry Army retreated towards Włodzimierz Wołyński on 6 September and was soon again defeated at the Battle of Hrubieszów. Suwalszczyzna was recaptured from the Lithuanian forces.

Tukhachevski managed to reorganize the eastward-retreating forces and in September established a new defensive line running from the Polish-Lithuanian border to the north to the area of Polesie, with the central point in the city of Grodno in Belarus. In order to break it, the Polish Army had to fight the Battle of the Niemen River, near the middle Neman River, between the cities of Suwałki, Grodno and Białystok. Polish forces attempted to surround the Soviet forces, moving through Lithuanian territory and the Pinsk Marshes. After Polish forces crossed the Niemen River, captured Lida and Pińsk, between September 15 and September 25, 1920, the Polish forces defeated and outflanked the Bolshevik forces, which were forced to retreat again.

On 12 September Polish offensive in Wołyń under Gen. Sikorski started. On 18 September Polish forces recaptured Równe, by the end of September Polish forces reached the rivers of Uborcia and Słucza and the town of Korseń. Podle offensive started on 14 September under gen. Lemezan de Sakins and S. Haller by that time reached the line from Stara Uszyca on the south through Zinków–Płoskirów–Starokonstantynów to Łabuń north. 

On Ukraine between 8 and 12 October Polish cavalry under Gen. J. Rómmel reached Korosteń. After the mid-October Battle of the Szczara River, the Polish Army had reached the Tarnopol-Dubno-Minsk-Drisa line. The Bolsheviks sued for peace and the Poles, exhausted and constantly pressured by the Western governments, with Polish army now controlling majority of disputed territories, agreed to try diplomatic solution once again. A ceasefire was signed October 12 and went into effect October 18.

References 

 The War Chronicles of Jerzy Dobiecki  by Ian von Heintze.  Winged Hussar Publishing.

Bibliography
P.Valasek, Haller's Polish Army in France, Chicago 2006

Conflicts in 1920
Polish–Soviet War
1920 in Poland